Bob Alexander (1922–1993) was a Major League Baseball pitcher.

Bob Alexander may also refer to:

 Bob Alexander (ring announcer) (born 1963), American professional ring announcer
 Bob Alexander, American candidate for Congress, see United States House of Representatives elections in Michigan, 2008
Bob Alexander (ice hockey) in 1983–84 New York Rangers season
Bob Alexander, musician, see Al Klink
Bob Alexander (trombonist) for Jay and Kai + 6

See also
Robert Alexander (disambiguation)